The Northumbrian Minstrel  is a songbook, giving the lyrics of local, now historical songs, printed and published at Alnwick in 1811 by William Davison. The majority of the songs are written by songwriters from the North of the County, and therefore the content differs from most of the other popular Northumbrian chapbooks.

Details
 The Northumbrian Minstrel  (full title - “The Northumbrian Minstrel; A Choice selection of Songs. Alnwick, Printed by W. Davison, 1811) is a songbook of Geordie folk songs consisting of almost  60 pages and 45 song lyric, published in 1811.

The publication 
It is, a collection of songs  from North Northumberland and Southern Scotland which would have been popular, or topical, at the date of publication. There is nothing in the way of biographies of the authors,  the histories of the events, or tunes.

The front cover of the book was as thus :-<br/ ><br/ >

THE<br/ >
Northumbrian<br/ >
MINSTREL<br/ >
A<br/ >
CHOICE SELECTION<br/ >
OF<br/ >
SONGS<br/ >
<br/ >

_<br/ >
ALNWICK<br/ >
PRINTED BY W. DAVISON<br/ >
<br/ >
1811<br/ >

Contents 
Are as below :-<br/ >

<br/ >

See also 
 Geordie dialect words

References

External links
 Full text of The Northumbrian Minstrel from the Hathi Trust
 Northumbrian Minstrelsy

English folk songs
Songs related to Newcastle upon Tyne
Northumbrian folklore
Geordie songwriters
1811 books
Song books